Stenotenes is a genus of moths belonging to the subfamily Tortricinae of the family Tortricidae.

Species
Stenotenes acroptycha Diakonoff, 1954
Stenotenes aspasia Diakonoff, 1972
Stenotenes incudis Diakonoff, 1954

Taxonomy
The genus is sometimes assigned to the Schoenotenini.

See also
List of Tortricidae genera

References

 , 2005: World catalogue of insects volume 5 Tortricidae

External links
tortricidae.com

Tortricini